The ju-jitsu events at the 2009 World Games in Kaohsiung was played between 21 and 22 July. 115 athletes, from 19 nations, participated in the tournament. The ju-jitsu competition took place at National Sun Yat-Sen University Gymnasium.

Participating nations

Medal table

Events

Duo

Men's fighting

Women's fighting

References

External links
 JJIF
 Ju-jitsu on IWGA website
 Results

 
2009 World Games
2009